Eder Líder Mármol Cuenca (born 2 September 1985 in Juan León Mallorquín, Alto Paraná) is a Paraguayan retired professional footballer. Marmol holds Italian documentation and counts as a Community player. Marmol was one of the first Paraguayans to arrive at the Major League Soccer. ABC Color branded his career as being made with much sacrifice.

Club career

Early career
In 1999, Marmol began his career at Club Deportivo 4 de Agosto, where he played for 4 seasons until 2002.

After four seasons at the club Mármol moved on to Paraguayan second division side Club Atlético River Plate (Asunción). His play at River started to gain him notice by the countries first division clubs. He was acquired by first division side Club Sol de América where he remained for one year. In 2005, he joined Club Guaraní, helping the club to a second-place finish in the Torneo Apertura. At Guaraní, he played in the defence with Julio Manzur, Gilberto Velázquez and German Centurión.

Europe
After two successful seasons at Guaraní, Mármol emigrated to Hércules CF in Spain's Second Division. After arriving in Spain during the December European transfer window, together with his Paraguayan compatriot Julio Irrazábal, both signed with a contract of six months with an option to extend to three years. Mármol became a fixture in the center of the defense starting eleven matches and scoring one goal for the Spanish side.

Following Marmol's stint in Spain's Segunda Liga, he trialled with English teams as Coventry City and Reading, however, before signing, his agent ask for a higher amount of money than was stipulated.

Chicago Fire
On 30 April 2008, it was announced that Marmol joined MLS team Chicago Fire after months of trialling with uncertainty with Chicago Fire and New York Red Bulls under the training of Colombian coach Juan Carlos Osorio. Chicago Fire Director of Football Frank Klopas said "We are very excited to have Líder in our organization. He is a good young player and we are sure he will make the team much stronger". Marmol would officially join the team when he'd receive his P-1 visa and work permit.

On 28 June 2008, Marmol appeared on the bench for Chicago Fire in a 0–0 home draw against San Jose Earthquakes. In this task, he was team mates with Mexican player Cuauhtémoc Blanco. On 1 July 2008, Marmol debuted for Chicago Fire in a Lamar Hunt Open Cup third-round victory against Cleveland City Stars and was praised by the coach. On 6 July 2008, Marmol debuted for Chicago Fire in a 2–2 away draw against Columbus Crew. He was substituted on the field for Justin Mapp in the 86th minute. In this event, Marmol also faced Argentine player Guillermo Barros Schelotto. On 21 September 2008, Marmol made his full debut, second appearance and also his last apprearance for Chicago Fire, when he started in a 4–1 home defeat against FC Dallas, playing all of the 90 minutes of the game.

In January 2009, Marmol was granted a release from Chicago Fire following a request submitted by the player.

He amassed 94 minutes for Chicago Fire in 1 start, and appeared on the bench on 9 occasions.

Latter career
On 20 April 2010, Medio Tiempo reported that Marmol was in the sight of 3 Mexican clubs. He was also mentioned with football in Spain and France.

He retired due to complications of recovery to injuries that he had.

Statistics

International

Líder Mármol has represented Paraguay at the under 20 level.

Personal life
Marmol was born in the city of Juan León Mallorquín in the Alto Paraná Department.

Whilst living in Luque, people stole from him an immense collection of more than 200 football jerseys.

From the money he received from his transfer from Guaraní to Spain's Hercules, he bought his mother a house, which was a dream of his whole life.

When he had a free day whilst playing for Chicago Fire, he was invited each week for lunch with the Paraguayans that had lived for years in Chicago. Also, he pointed to the food he wanted to eat when ordering it at a restaurant since he couldn't speak in English.

In October 2010, his sister faked her own kidnapping in an attempt to extort USD $40, 000.00 from Marmol. Marmol told Ultima Hora that he was hurt when he found out that his sister faked her own kidnapping to take money from him. One of Marmol's brother's received a call, reclaiming a pay near to USD $40, 000.00 for the release of his sister. The same day, his sister – who was in debt and had 5 children to maintain – appeared and confessed that she was involved in a self-kidnapping, she was arrested and charger with simulation of a punishable act.

In 2010, Marmol passed Christmas with Atlante teammate Mario Ortiz in Mexico as they lived in the same building.

Since retiring, he began an electronic games business.

In 2020, he was studying to be a football coach.

References

External links
 BDFA Profile
 Soccerway Profile
 Profile while at Hercules (futbolme.com)  
 Player profile (soccerplanet-jwt.com) 
 
 

1985 births
Living people
Paraguayan footballers
Association football defenders
River Plate (Asunción) footballers
Club Sol de América footballers
Club Guaraní players
Hércules CF players
Atlante F.C. footballers
Chicago Fire FC players
San Martín de San Juan footballers
Atlético Tucumán footballers
12 de Octubre Football Club players
Paraguayan Primera División players
Segunda División players
Major League Soccer players
Liga MX players
Paraguayan expatriate footballers
Paraguayan expatriate sportspeople in Argentina
Paraguayan expatriate sportspeople in Mexico
Paraguayan expatriate sportspeople in the United States
Paraguayan expatriate sportspeople in Spain
Expatriate footballers in Argentina
Expatriate footballers in Mexico
Expatriate soccer players in the United States
Expatriate footballers in Spain
Association football utility players
People from Alto Paraná Department